The Anaheim Fire & Rescue is the agency that provides fire protection and emergency medical services for Anaheim, California.

History 
In 1857 the City of Anaheim was incorporated and the City's volunteer fire system was established. Initially the volunteer department consisted of twenty men. It wasn't until 1915 that the department purchased their first motorized ladder truck. At this time the Anaheim City Council authorized the employment of two full-time firemen. These two men worked 24 hours a day, seven days a week, and lived at the Anaheim Fire Station.

Volunteers continued to provide fire services until 1960, when the number of annual calls reached nearly a thousand and it was felt that the Department should be made up of professionally trained fire personnel.

Metro Cities Fire Authority 
Anaheim Fire & Rescue is part of the Metro Cities Fire Authority which provides emergency communications for multiple departments in and around Orange County. Other departments included in Metro Net include Brea Fire Department, Fountain Valley, Fullerton Fire Department, Huntington Beach Fire Department, Newport Beach Fire Department, and Orange Fire Department.

Stations & Apparatus 
Anaheim Fire & Rescue is divided into two battalions; Battalion 1 consisting of six fire stations, and Battalion 2 with five stations.

References 

Fire departments in California
Emergency services in Orange County, California
Ambulance services in the United States
Fire Department
Government of Anaheim, California
Medical and health organizations based in California